Schroeppel House is a historic home located in Schroeppel in Oswego County, New York.   The original section was built in 1818 and is a Neoclassical-style structure.  The principal mass is a three- by four-bay, -story frame house constructed in the style of a prostyle tetrastyle temple.  It features a 2-story portico with Ionic columns.  The house is currently used as a bed and breakfast called River Edge Mansion.

It was listed on the National Register of Historic Places in 1982.

References

Houses on the National Register of Historic Places in New York (state)
Houses completed in 1818
Houses in Oswego County, New York
National Register of Historic Places in Oswego County, New York